Robert Adam   (born 1948) is a Driehaus Architecture Prize winning British architect, urban designer and author, known for championing classical and traditional styles. Adam is a visiting professor at the University of Strathclyde and Design Council Expert.

His career was the subject of Richard John's Robert Adam and the Search for a Modern Classicism, a survey of Adam's projects with a foreword by Charles, Prince of Wales.

Education and early career
Adam attended the University of Westminster. In 1973, he won the British School at Rome's Rome Prize in Architecture.

Adam practiced as an architect, working part-time as a freelance architectural journalist until 1977, when he became partner at a firm in Winchester. In 1992, he founded Robert Adam Architects there.

In 2021, he was awarded Degree of Doctor of Philosophy (PhD) by Oxford Brookes University.

Work

Edinburgh Forthside

Adam was appointed master-planner of Edinburgh Forthside in which capacity he designed streetscapes of low-rise buildings in Leith and Granton.

Adam prescribed strict design codes on the area's developers so that both modern and traditional architects could build alongside one another without clashing. Builders had to adhere to guidelines on size, materials and proportions. Adam also laid out rules on how the buildings relate to the streets such as a ban on glass facades.

Sackler Library

Adam designed Oxford University’s Sackler Library, which opened in 2001 and incorporated Oxford's Ashmolean Museum collections. The principal building is a circular library, with a smaller circular entrance onto the street, and attached wings arranged around internal courtyards. His design referenced ancient Greek architecture, specifically the Temple of Apollo at Bassae.

Ashley Park

Ashley Park, Hampshire, a new country house, completed in 2004, was the first new building to gain permission under 1997 English planning regulations that allowed major new houses in the countryside. It was described by the government inspector that granted the permission as, "an innovative approach to the classical traditions, re-interpreted for the 21st century."

198–202, Piccadilly

198–202 Piccadilly, London, an office development with ground floor retail, was completed in 2007. The classical building was designed to fit within the established historic setting. An octagonal tower marks the corner of the site and, at the upper levels, a colonnaded glass rooftop pavilion screens the plant rooms. Each façade is detailed to reflect the character of that street and the design incorporates cast bronze column capitals by classical sculptor, Alexander Stoddart.

Books
 Classical Architecture: A Complete Handbook, (1990) London:Viking
 The 7 Sins of Architects, (2010)
 The Globalisation of Modern Architecture: The Impact of Politics, Economics and Social Change on Architecture and Urban Design since 1990, (2012) Newcastle upon Tyne:Cambridge Scholars Publishing
 Classic Columns: 40 Years of Writing on Architecture, (2017) Cumulus
 Time for Architecture: On Modernity, Memory and Time in Architecture and Urban Design, (2020) Newcastle upon Tyne:Cambridge Scholars Publishing

Exhibits
Pembroke Table (1986), a drop-leaf table designed by Robert Adam in the permanent collection of the Victoria and Albert Museum, cited by the museum as "an example of the revivalism that has become a significant, if much debated, part of 1980s architecture and design."

Tower of the Orders – A drawing by Adam, displayed at RIBA, intended to represent the "continuity of classicism with the antique architectural orders".

Awards

References

20th-century British architects
21st-century British architects
New Classical architects
1948 births
Living people